Begovo Brdo is a village in Kruševac, Rasina district, Serbia.

Kruševac
Populated places in Rasina District